Man with a Gun (also known as Hired for Killing) is a 1995 Canadian crime-thriller film  directed  by David Wyles and starring Michael Madsen, Jennifer Tilly, Gary Busey and Robert Loggia. It is loosely based on the novel The Shroud Society by Hugh C. Rae.

Plot
An assassin is hired to kill the woman he loves.

Cast
Michael Madsen as  John Wilbur Hardin
Jennifer Tilly as Rena Rushton / Kathy Payne
Gary Busey as Jack Rushton
Robert Loggia as Philip Marquand
Ian Tracey as  Roy Burchill
Bill Cobbs as  Henry Griggs
Bill Dow as  Ed Quigley
 Jason Schombing as  Eli Spindel  
 Mina E. Mina as Max Appleman

References

External links 

Canadian crime thriller films
1995 crime thriller films
1995 films
English-language Canadian films
1990s English-language films
1990s Canadian films